The following is a list of Supreme Court of Canada opinions written by Suzanne Côté during her tenure on the Court.

2015 

{| width=100%
|-
|
{| width=100% align=center cellpadding=0 cellspacing=0
|-
! bgcolor=#CCCCCC | Statistics
|-
|

 Quebec (Commission des droits de la personne et des droits de la jeunesse) v. Bombardier Inc. (Bombardier Aerospace Training Center), 2015 SCC 39 (majority)
 Alberta (Attorney General) v. Moloney, 2015 SCC 51 (concurrence)
 407 ETR Concession Co. v. Canada (Superintendent of Bankruptcy), 2015 SCC 52 (concurrence)
 Saskatchewan (Attorney General) v. Lemare Lake Logging Ltd., 2015 SCC 53 (dissent)
 Caron v. Alberta, 2015 SCC 56 (dissent)
 Canadian Imperial Bank of Commerce v. Green, 2015 SCC 60 (majority in Celestica; dissent in part in CIBC and IMAX)

2016 

{| width=100%
|-
|
{| width=100% align=center cellpadding=0 cellspacing=0
|-
! bgcolor=#CCCCCC | 2016 statistics
|-
|

2017
{| width=100%
|-
|
{| width=100% align=center cellpadding=0 cellspacing=0
|-
! bgcolor=#CCCCCC | 2017 statistics
|-
|

* Note: This list is current to November 5, 2016

Cote